Garfield is a town in Victoria, Australia, 79 km south-east of Melbourne's Central Business District, located within the Shire of Cardinia local government area. Garfield recorded a population of 2,114 at the 2021 census.

History

The area was originally called Cannibal Creek, but was renamed to Garfield in memory of the U.S. President James A. Garfield.

The Post Office opened as Cannibal Creek on 1 May 1886 and was renamed Garfield in 1887.

Garfield today

Garfield has a primary school with approximately 490 students. There is a church at the top end of the schoolgrounds. Local businesses include a milk bar, and a newsagency

The town has an Australian Rules football team playing in the Ellinbank and District Football League. Garfield has an undulating golf course on Thirteen Mile Road run by the Garfield Golf Club.

Gallery

See also
 Shire of Pakenham – Garfield was previously within this former local government area.
 Garfield railway station

References

Towns in Victoria (Australia)
Shire of Cardinia
Australian places named after U.S. places or U.S. history